Chinese food refers to Chinese cuisine or food.

Chinese food may also refer to:

"Chinese Food" (song), a 2013 song that went viral by newcomer singer Alison Gold
China Foods Limited, or China Foods, formerly COFCO International Limited, company engaged in food processing and food trading
Chinese food therapy (or shíliáo), practice in the belief of healing through the use of natural foods instead of, or in addition to medications

See also
Chinese food box, or Chinese takeout container, an alternative name for Oyster pail
Chinese food syndrome, or Chinese restaurant syndrome (CRS) commonly associated to monosodium glutamate (MSG)
Chinese Food in Minutes, a British TV series, based upon Ching He Huang's cookbook of the same name
Chinese Food Made Easy, a British cooking television series by Ching He Huang